David Hodges (born 17 January 1970) is an English former professional footballer who played in the Football League for Mansfield Town, Shrewsbury Town and Torquay United.

References

1970 births
Living people
English footballers
Association football midfielders
English Football League players
Mansfield Town F.C. players
Torquay United F.C. players
Kettering Town F.C. players
Bolton Wanderers F.C. players
Shrewsbury Town F.C. players
Gloucester City A.F.C. players
Bromsgrove Rovers F.C. players